Miss Mary is a 1972 Indian Malayalam film, directed by Jambu and produced by Jambu. The film stars Prem Nazir, Renuka, Adoor Bhasi and Prema in the lead roles. The film had musical score by R. K. Shekhar.

Cast

Prem Nazir
Renuka
Adoor Bhasi
Prema
Sankaradi
T. R. Omana
T. S. Muthaiah
Paul Vengola
Bahadoor
Junior Sheela
Nellikode Bhaskaran
Veeran

Soundtrack
The music was composed by R. K. Shekhar and the lyrics were written by Sreekumaran Thampi.

References

External links
 

1972 films
1970s Malayalam-language films